Cornățelu is a commune in Dâmbovița County, Muntenia, Romania with a population of 5,449 people. It is composed of five villages: Alunișu, Bolovani, Cornățelu, Corni, and Slobozia.

Natives
 Florica Petcu-Dospinescu
 Ilie Savu

References

Communes in Dâmbovița County
Localities in Muntenia